Héctor Guevara Ramírez (born 29 September 1956) is a Mexican politician from the Institutional Revolutionary Party. From 2009 to 2012 he served as Deputy of the LXI Legislature of the Mexican Congress representing the State of Mexico.

References

1956 births
Living people
21st-century Mexican politicians
Institutional Revolutionary Party politicians
National Autonomous University of Mexico alumni
Politicians from Puebla
People from Huauchinango
Deputies of the LXI Legislature of Mexico
Members of the Chamber of Deputies (Mexico) for the State of Mexico